Ergalatax is a genus of sea snails, marine gastropod mollusks in the subfamily Ergalataxinae of the family Muricidae, the murex snails or rock snails.

Species
Species within the genus Ergalatax include:
 Ergalatax contracta (Reeve, 1846)
 Ergalatax crassulnata (Hedley, 1915)
 Ergalatax dattilioi Houart, 1998
 Ergalatax heptagonalis (Reeve, 1846)
 Ergalatax junionae Houart, 2008
 Ergalatax margariticola (Broderip, in Broderip & Sowerby, 1833)
 Ergalatax martensi (Schepman, 1892)
 Ergalatax pauper (Watson, 1883)
 Ergalatax tokugawai Kuroda & Habe, 1971
 Ergalatax zebra Houart, 1995
Species brought into synonymy
 Ergalatax margariticola (Broderip in Broderip & Sowerby, 1833): synonym of Drupella margariticola (Broderip, 1833)
 Ergalatax martensi (Dall, 1923): synonym of Ergalatax junionae Houart, 2008 (secondary homonym of Ergalatax martensi (Schepman, 1892); Ergalatax junionae Houart, 2008 is a replacement name)
 Ergalatax obscura Houart, 1996: synonym of Ergalatax martensi (Schepman, 1892) (synonym)
 Ergalatax purpureus Kuroda & Habe, 1961: synonym of Orania purpurea (Kuroda & Habe, 1961) (original combination)
 Ergalatax recurrens Iredale, 1931: synonym of Ergalatax pauper (R. B. Watson, 1883)

References

 Houart R. (1995["1994"]) The Ergalataxinae (Gastropoda, Muricidae) from the New Caledonia region with some comments on the subfamily and the description of thirteen new species from the Indo-West Pacific. Bulletin du Muséum National d'Histoire Naturelle, Paris, ser. 4, 16(A, 2-4): 245-297

External links
 Iredale, T. (1931). Australian molluscan notes. Nº I. Records of the Australian Museum. 18: 201-235

 
Gastropod genera